Gerry is a 2002 American drama film written and directed by Gus Van Sant and starring and co-written by Matt Damon and Casey Affleck. It is the first film of Van Sant's "Death Trilogy", three films based on deaths that occurred in real life and is succeeded by Elephant (2003) and Last Days (2005).

Gerry follows two hiking companions who both go by the name "Gerry". "Gerry" is also a slang term, used by both protagonists throughout the misadventure, meaning "to screw up". Van Sant revealed in interviews that Damon, Affleck and his brother Ben had already coined the term before the movie had been named.

The film's plot shares some commonalities with the events surrounding the death of David Coughlin, who was killed after he and a friend became lost in Rattlesnake Canyon in New Mexico. The film's style was largely inspired by the work of Hungarian director Béla Tarr, namely its use of extended scenes playing out in uncut master shots. There are a few direct visual quotations from Tarr's Sátántangó such as a shot following the two protagonists while tumbleweeds blow around them that mimics a shot in Tarr's film where two men walk through a town as a windstorm blows around leaves and trash.

Besides the work of Béla Tarr, the video game Tomb Raider was cited as an influence on the style of the film. Van Sant had mentioned that he hadn't had much experience with video games and was struck by the fact that the lack of the ability to cut away from the action in video games meant having to stay with the characters during travel that would normally be glossed over in films. In an interview with Filmmaker Magazine Van Sant stated "In some ways, Gerry is Béla Tarr fused with Tomb Raider!"

Gerry is frequently cited as an example of non-narrative cinema.

Plot
The characters drive to a remote location to hike at a site marked "Wilderness Trail". As they start, they see some other hikers passing by. In order to not be bothered by these hikers, they decide to go off-trail. After some walking, talking, and an impromptu foot race, they decide to head back. Before long, they realize that they are lost. That night, they build a campfire.

Over the next couple of days, the two hikers wander through the wilderness without food or water. They try to split up for a while, retrace their steps and follow some animal tracks, all to no avail. They grow increasingly irritated with each other as the situation becomes dire.

They eventually find themselves slowly walking mostly in silence through a desert. They finally collapse due to fatigue and dehydration. The weaker of the two (Affleck) proclaims that he is "leaving" and reaches towards Damon's character. Damon's character rolls on top of Affleck and wordlessly strangles him before collapsing again.

After some time, Damon's character awakens and realizes that a highway is not far away. In the final sequence, he is badly sunburned but watches the passing landscape from the car of the father and son who have seemingly rescued him.

Production
The inspiration for the film was the real-life murder of David Coughlin, which Damon related to Van Sant, in which Coughlin and his best friend got lost in the desert, with the latter eventually killing Coughlin. Van Sant deliberately chose not to look up more information on the event because "we didn't want to do their story," instead deciding it would be "an inspirational aside".

Besides the news item, other influences include Van Sant's own experience getting lost as well as Chantal Akerman's Jeanne Dielman, 23 quai du Commerce, 1080 Bruxelles (1975). Initially Van Sant planned to shoot the film with digital video, which he said would have resembled "a John Cassavetes film in the desert". Casey Affleck eventually convinced him to use 35 mm film instead, with Van Sant noting, "once we did that, everything changed". From this decision he began incorporating influences from the film work of Béla Tarr, specifically his use of long takes.

The film is notable for its lack of dialogue. Initially Van Sant "thought we were definitely going to have a lot of long bits of soul-searching dialogue." During shooting this never came to pass, and Van Sant asserted that the long silences were "our version" of such dialogue. Van Sant wanted the spare dialogue not to cover things for the audience's sake; he explained, "When [Matt and Casey] are talking, they’re just talking and not pointing out stuff that we’re supposed to know. If they’re talking about something, and we don’t know what they’re talking about, then that’s okay. So long as they know what they’re talking about."

Van Sant hoped to shoot the film in Argentina to avoid a possible Actors Guild strike, but the location proved colder than anticipated. He then looked to Wadi Rum in Jordan, but he was dissuaded from going there because a travel advisory was in effect due to potential terrorist activities. The team finally settled on Death Valley, California. Although the film had a script, it was used as more of an outline, and the team regularly disregarded it. They were unsure of how the film would end if the film was shot in sequence.

The film is dedicated to the memory of American writer Ken Kesey.

Critical reception
The film received generally mixed critical reviews. On the review aggregator website Rotten Tomatoes, it has an approval rating of 61%, based on 100 reviews, with an average rating of 6.20/10. The website’s critics consensus states that Gerry is "The type of uncompromising film that divides filmgoers over whether it is profound or pretentious." Metacritic, using a weighted average, assigned the film a score of 54 out of 100 based on 31 reviews, indicating "mixed or average reviews".

See also
 Narrativity

References

External links
 
 
 
 
 

2002 films
2000s avant-garde and experimental films
2000s buddy drama films
2002 drama films
2002 independent films
American drama films
American avant-garde and experimental films
American independent films
American survival films
Death Valley
Drama films based on actual events
2000s English-language films
Films directed by Gus Van Sant
Films set in deserts
Films shot in Argentina
Films shot in California
Films shot in Utah
Murder in films
Films with screenplays by Casey Affleck
Films with screenplays by Matt Damon
Films with screenplays by Gus Van Sant
2000s American films